The 2022 Conference USA women's soccer tournament was the postseason women's soccer tournament for Conference USA held from November 2 through November 6, 2022. The seven-match tournament took place at Transamerica Field in Charlotte, North Carolina. The eight-team single-elimination tournament consisted of three rounds based on seeding from regular season conference play. The defending champions were the Old Dominion Monarchs. Old Dominion was unable to defended their title as they moved to the Sun Belt Conference in 2022. The UTSA Roadrunners won the title by defeating Florida Atlantic 3–2 in overtime the final. The conference championship was the first for the UTSA women's soccer program and first for head coach Derek Pittman. As tournament champions, UTSA earned C-USA's automatic berth into the 2022 NCAA Division I women's soccer tournament.

Seeding 
Eight Conference USA schools participated in the tournament. Teams were seeded by conference record.  No tiebreakers were required as each team finished with a unique conference regular season record.

Bracket

Source:

Schedule

Quarterfinals

Semifinals

Final

Statistics

Goalscorers

All-Tournament team

Source:

* Offensive MVP
^ Defensive MVP

References 

Conference USA Women's Soccer Tournament
2022 Conference USA women's soccer season